Creazzo is a town and comune in the province of Vicenza, Veneto, Italy. Creazzo is famous for its architecture, cheese, Madame and broccolo fiolaro (a local variety of cabbage).

The Battle of Creazzo was fought here in 1513 between the Republic of Venice and the combined force of Spain and the Holy Roman Empire.

One major employer is Mecc Alte S.p.A., a manufacturer of alternators and generators.

References

External links
Google Maps

Cities and towns in Veneto